is a private university at Akita, Akita, Japan, founded in 1953.

The college was founded as Akita Junior College, with departments of economics and commerce. A department of home economics was added in 1954. The college was relocated to its present location in 1983. A nutrition department was added in 1990. The college was renamed the Akita Economics Junior College in 1997 and its curriculum restructured around three departments: Commerce and Economics, Information Science and Lifestyle. It was renamed the Akita Nutrition Junior College in 2005, specializing in a Department of Nutrition only.

External links
 Official website

Educational institutions established in 1953
Private universities and colleges in Japan
Japanese junior colleges
Universities and colleges in Akita Prefecture
1953 establishments in Japan
Buildings and structures in Akita (city)